Adenophora divaricata, also known as spreading-branch ladybell, is a flowering perennial plant of the genus Adenophora, in the Bellflower family. It is distributed in East Asia, including China, Japan, Korea, and the Russian Far East.

Description
Adenophora divaricata has blue or light purple bell-shaped flowers. It grows in forests, shrublands, and on grassy slopes.

References

Campanuloideae
Plants described in 1878
Flora of Amur Oblast
Flora of China
Flora of Japan
Flora of Khabarovsk Krai
Taxa named by Adrien René Franchet